The Seattle SuperSonics were an American professional basketball team based in Seattle, Washington. They played in the Western, Pacific and Northwest divisions of the Western Conference in the National Basketball Association (NBA). The team joined the NBA in 1967 as an expansion team, and won their first and only NBA Championship out of 22 playoffs appearances in the 1979 NBA Finals. The SuperSonics played their home games mainly at the Seattle Center Coliseum, the Kingdome during eight seasons, and the Tacoma Dome for one season while the Coliseum was being remodeled and later renamed KeyArena.

The SuperSonics started building their roster in the 1967 NBA Draft and the 1967 NBA Expansion Draft. Since then 257 players have appeared in at least one game for the franchise. Seven players were inducted in the Naismith Memorial Basketball Hall of Fame, Patrick Ewing, Spencer Haywood, Šarūnas Marčiulionis, Gary Payton, David Thompson, who played no more than two seasons with the Sonics,  and Dennis Johnson and Lenny Wilkens, who were part of the 1979 Championship team, with the former as player and the latter as coach. Wilkens was also inducted to the Hall of Fame as coach, having the longest career-span of any coach in NBA history.



A

B

C

D

E

F

G

H

J

K

L

M

N

O

P

R

S

T

V

W

Y

Z

Coaches

References
 

Seattle SuperSonics
 
Seattle SuperSonics
Washington (state) sports-related lists
Seattle-related lists